Upminster Depot is a London Underground railway depot on the District line, in Cranham, East London. The depot is located beyond Upminster station, the terminus of the line.

History 

The depot was built in the mid 1950s as part of the segregation of District line tracks from the London, Tilbury and Southend line. District line trains were being stabled at Little Ilford Depot, however this land was required by British Railways. A new depot was therefore built at Upminster, beyond the terminus of the District line station. The depot opened in 1959, the first Underground depot to be built after the Second World War.

Allocation 
As of 2016, the depot's allocation consists of London Underground S7 Stock, the only rolling stock used on the District line. Previously the depot was allocated D78 Stock trains.

See also 

 Ealing Common Depot
 Lillie Bridge Depot
 Acton Works

References 

Upminster
London Underground depots
Railway depots in London
Transport in the London Borough of Havering